Otham Manor, previously known as Wardes, is a late 14th-century manor house in Otham, Kent.

The house was built in the late 14th century, probably around 1370, and was altered and extended in the 16th century. It is a L-shaped two-storey timber-framed hall house; the north wing being the older part and the south wing being from the 16th century. The north wing has jettied bays at each end; the western bay having been rebuilt. The clay tiled hipped roof is steeply pitched with a gable to the south end of the south wing. Internally the roof structure is exposed with tie beams and king post.

The house was restored in 1912 by Sir Louis du Pan Mallet who added an extension to the west side of the southern wing. The whole house is a Grade I listed building.

The Listing described the mansion as a "GV I House, formerly cottages, now house. Late C14 with C16 alterations and additions". The estate was in a state of  "semi-dereliction by the early 1990s" according to Country Life (magazine). It was subsequently restored by new owners and listed for sale in 2019.

See also
Similar hall houses in Otham:
Synyards
Stoneacre
Grade I listed buildings in Maidstone

References

External links
Images of Wardes from 1917, National Monument Record:ViewFinder, English Heritage
Corpus Vitrearum Medii Aevi, Otham: Otham Manor Image of the stained glass window

Borough of Maidstone
Grade I listed houses in Kent